The 2024 United States Senate election in Arizona will be held on November 5, 2024, to elect a member of the United States Senate to represent the State of Arizona. Incumbent one-term Independent Senator Kyrsten Sinema was elected in 2018 as a Democrat with 50% of the vote, succeeding retiring Republican Jeff Flake. Sinema left the Democratic Party in December 2022, but remained in the Democratic caucus.

Sinema has not declared if she will run for re-election. U.S. Representative Ruben Gallego is seeking the Democratic nomination.

Independents

Candidates

Filed paperwork 
Kyrsten Sinema, incumbent U.S. Senator (2019–present)

Democratic primary

Sinema was considered highly vulnerable to a primary challenge due to her opposition to several parts of the Democratic Party's legislative agenda. The most prominent dispute was over the Build Back Better Act, specifically the provisions concerning lowering prescription drug prices, as well as her opposition to increasing the minimum wage and to filibuster reform. Prospective polling showed Sinema trailing all of her potential challengers by wide margins, with U.S. Representative Ruben Gallego being viewed by numerous political analysts as the frontrunner to challenge the incumbent. On January 22, 2022, the Arizona Democratic Party voted overwhelmingly to censure Sinema for a second time for voting against a carve-out to the filibuster in a Democratic-led effort to pass the John Lewis Voting Rights Act.

During the congressional consideration of the Inflation Reduction Act in August 2022, Sinema did not initially announce support for the bill, doing so only after Democratic leaders agreed to remove a provision on closing the so-called carried interest tax loophole, the closure of which would have raised taxes on hedge fund owners and investment managers. This action renewed calls from Democrats for Sinema to face a primary opponent in her next election. Sinema left the Democratic Party in December 2022 and registered as an Independent.

Candidates

Declared

Potential
 Paul Penzone, Maricopa County Sheriff (2017–present)
 Regina Romero, Mayor of Tucson (2019–present)

Declined 
 Kate Gallego, Mayor of Phoenix (2019–present)

Endorsements

Polling

Republican primary
Former Arizona Governor Doug Ducey was considered a potential candidate, but said he would not run. He would likely have faced a contested primary election due to former President Donald Trump's repeated criticism of him for refusing to overturn the results of the 2020 presidential election. Pro-Trump contenders include congressmen Andy Biggs and Pinal County Sheriff Mark Lamb, who has reportedly been encouraged to run by 2022 gubernatorial nominee Kari Lake, who herself has expressed interest in running for the seat.

Candidates

Announcement pending
Mark Lamb, Pinal County Sheriff (2017–present) (announcement expected by May 2023)

Publicly expressed interest
Abe Hamadeh, former Maricopa County Prosecutor and nominee for Arizona Attorney General in 2022 (will not run if Lake runs)
Kari Lake, former news anchor and nominee for Governor of Arizona in 2022
Jim Lamon, solar power executive and candidate for U.S. Senate in 2022
Blake Masters, former president of the Thiel Foundation, former COO of Thiel Capital and nominee for the U.S. Senate in 2022
Karrin Taylor Robson, former member of the Arizona Board of Regents (2017–2021) and candidate for Governor of Arizona in 2022
T.J. Shope, President pro tempore of the Arizona Senate (2023–present) from the 16th district (2021–present)

Potential

Declined
Doug Ducey, former Governor of Arizona (2015–2023)
Kelli Ward, former state senator from the 5th district (2013–2015), former chair of the Arizona Republican Party (2019–2023), and candidate for U.S. Senate in 2016 and 2018

General election

Predictions

Endorsements

Polling

Ruben Gallego vs. Kari Lake (vs. Kyrsten Sinema)

Ruben Gallego vs. Doug Ducey (vs. Kyrsten Sinema)

Ruben Gallego vs. Blake Masters (vs. Kyrsten Sinema)

Ruben Gallego vs. Karrin Taylor-Robson (vs. Kyrsten Sinema)

Notes

Partisan clients

References

External links
Official campaign websites 
Ruben Gallego (D) for Senate

2024
Arizona
United States Senate